Small nucleolar RNA 775 (snoR775) is a snoRNAs, belonging to the H/ACA class.

Location 
SnoR775 was discovered in the promoter-based non-coding RNA identification study in Arabidopsis thaliana.  Its name is based on its close proximity to micro RNA miR775. In fact the snoR775 and miR775 precursors are encoded by a single gene (named sno-miR775). This arrangement might have interesting functional and evolutionary consequences.

See also 
 TeloSII ncRNAs

References 

Small nuclear RNA